Seven souls may refer to:
Egyptian soul, a concept with several distinct elements

(The) Seven Souls, an American soul/R&B group formed in 1964 in Los Angeles, California (included member Bob Welch who would later join Fleetwood Mac)
Seven Souls (album), a music album by Material